Wilson Waigwa (born February 15, 1949) is a Kenyan long distance and middle-distance runner.   He competed for Kenya in the 5,000 meters at the 1984 Olympics.  He also competed for Kenya at the 1987 World Indoor Championships and the 1984 World Cross Country Championships.

While competing for the University of Texas, El Paso he won the 1977 NCAA Championship in the 1,500 meters.  He first broke 4 minutes for the mile on February 15, 1974 and was a formidable world class miler for more than a decade.  His personal record was 3:50.73 set at the end of the 1983 season in Koblenz, Germany.  More than 3 decades later it still ranks as #88 on the all-time list at the time he was running he was in the top dozen.

References

External links

1949 births
Kenyan male middle-distance runners
Athletes (track and field) at the 1978 Commonwealth Games
Athletes (track and field) at the 1982 Commonwealth Games
Commonwealth Games competitors for Kenya
Athletes (track and field) at the 1984 Summer Olympics
Olympic athletes of Kenya
Living people
African Games silver medalists for Kenya
African Games medalists in athletics (track and field)
Athletes (track and field) at the 1978 All-Africa Games